Kühkopf-Knoblochsaue is a  (nature reserve) of European standard, located in the Groß-Gerau district, Germany. It is the largest nature reserve in Hesse, part of the Hessian Ried between the river Rhine and the Hessische Bergstraße. It is also the largest continuous  along the Hessian part of the Rhine, providing flood control.

History 

Until the beginning of the 17th century, the Kühkopf was a hunting area for noble families, also for farming from single estates (Hofgüter). On 7 September 1631, Gustavus Adolphus of Sweden and his army crossed the Rhine during the Thirty Years' War, memorialized by the  monument in the Knoblochsaue.

In 1828/29, directed by Großherzoglicher Darmstädter Wasserbaudirektor , a shortcut of the river (Rhein-Durchstich) shortened the passage for ships. The Kühkopf became an island with the new Rhine in the west and the former river bed (Altrhein). The former island Knoblochsaue became a peninsula.

The ecology of the area is of great importance, and has been protected from 20 March 1952. It is now a Europareservat, protected since 2008 by the Habitats Directive of the European Union.

Nature and landscape 
The protected area contains riparian forests (Auwald or Aue), both  with typical  and black poplar, and bottomland hardwood forest with oak, elm and aspen.

The Kühkopf area has a long tradition of orchards. In 1960, 3531 apple trees, 61 pear trees, 130 plum trees, 36 walnut trees and five mirabelle plum trees were counted, planted as Streuobst (orchard). The protected area has more than 2000 fruit trees, including more than 30 kinds of apples.

The extended swamps of the floodplains, with grass, reed beds and trees, offer breeding places for many kinds of birds, and resting places for migrating birds. The symbol of the Kühkopf is the black kite. Deer, wild boars, foxes, frogs and toads are common in the protected area. In spring, much of the forest floor is covered by wild garlic. Many trees host mistletoes.

References

Further reading

External links 

 
 Kühkopf-Knoblochsaue Portal of Groß-Gerau and Rhein-Main
 Naturschutzgebiet Kühkopf-Knoblochsaue schatzinsel-kuehkopf.hessen.de
 

Nature reserves in Hesse
IUCN Category IV